PT Bank Tabungan Negara (Persero) Tbk (lit. "State Savings Bank"), trading as Bank BTN, is an Indonesian commercial bank best known as a mortgage bank, headquartered in Gambir, Jakarta.

Founded in 1897 by the government of the Dutch East Indies as a post office savings bank, its products include banks accounts (savings, current, and fixed deposit), loans (personal, business, and mortgage loans—the latter being its most popular offering since its introduction in the 1970s) and Sharia-compliant banking services.

History 
Bank Tabungan Negara was established in 1897 as a postal savings bank under the name Postspaarbank, with its headquarters located in Batavia. During the Japanese occupation of Indonesia, the bank was frozen and replaced with the  After the proclamation of Indonesian independence, the bank was taken over by the Indonesian government on 9 February 1950 under the Emergency Law No.9 and renamed Bank Tabungan Pos (Postal Savings Bank). In 1963 the bank's current name, Bank Tabungan Negara, was adopted. Bank BTN became the first bank to be appointed by the government to provide housing finance and mortgages to lower and middle income individuals.

The bank underwent a corporate restructure in 2003, which was followed by an initial public offering (IPO) in 2009 that led to the listing of Bank BTN on the Indonesia Stock Exchange. The IPO was ranked as Indonesia's largest IPO as of 2009.

Operations 
Bank Tabungan Negara's operations are divided into six regions; Sumatera, Java, Bali & Nusa Tenggara, Kalimantan, Sulawesi, and Papua & Maluku. As of December 2014, these regions gave the bank a total of 820 branches, 2,951 post office access points, and 1,830 ATMs, served by 8,582 employees.

Ownership 
The stock of Bank Tabungan Negara is listed on the Indonesia Stock Exchange, where it trades under the symbol BBTN. , shareholding in the bank's stock was as indicated in the table below:

Due to being majority held by the Indonesian government, Bank Tabungan Negara is considered to be one of the four state owned banks in Indonesia.

Governance 
Bank Tabungan Negara is governed by a six-person Board of Commissioners. , Chandra M. Hamzah became the President Commissioner, succeeding Mardiasmo. The President Director  is Maryono.

See also 
 List of banks in Indonesia
 Financial Services Authority of Indonesia

References 

1897 establishments in the Dutch East Indies
2009 initial public offerings
Banks established in 1897
Banks of Indonesia
Indonesian brands
Government-owned banks of Indonesia
Companies listed on the Indonesia Stock Exchange
Postal savings system